Benji is a 2018 American adventure drama film written and directed by Brandon Camp, and produced by Blumhouse Productions. The film is a reboot of the 1974 film of the same title, which was directed by Camp's father Joe. It stars Gabriel Bateman and Darby Camp. Jason Blum served as a producer through his Blumhouse Productions label.

The film was released on March 16, 2018 by Netflix. It was also released theatrically in China.

Plot 
A dog comes to the rescue and helps heal a broken family when a boy and his sister stumble into serious danger. The dog stays with the family, and then he tries to save the family by helping him with troubles.

Cast 
 Gabriel Bateman as Carter Hughes
 Darby Camp as Frankie Hughes
 Kiele Sanchez as Whitney Hughes
 Gralen Bryant Banks as Sam King
 Will Rothhaar as Syd Weld
 Angus Sampson as Titus Weld
 Jerod Haynes as Lyle Burton
 Lacy Camp as Officer
 Jim Gleason as Captain Newsome
 Brady Permenter as Brute
 James W. Evermore as Hot Dog Vendor
 Tom Proctor as Cajun Captain
 Arthur J. Robinson as Mr. Okra
 Cooper as Benji
 Rott as Himself
 Mongrel as Herself
 Robbie Daymond as The Voice of Benji
 Kevin Michael Richardson as The Voice of Mongrel
 Khary Payton as The Voice of Rott

Production 
On May 21, 2016 Blumhouse Productions announced a reboot of the 1974 film Benji which would be directed by Brandon Camp with Gabriel Bateman starring in the film.

Filming
Principal photography on the film began in October 2016 in New Orleans.

Release
The film was released on March 16, 2018, by Netflix. The film served as Blumhouse Productions' first film to be released as a family film.

Reception
, review aggregator website Rotten Tomatoes gave the film an approval rating of  based on  reviews. As of March, 2020, Metacritic gave the film a weighted average score of 53 out of 100, based on 7 critics, indicating "mixed or average reviews".

It grossed $585,333 at the Chinese box office.

References

External links 
 

2018 films
American drama films
Benji
Films about dogs
Films about child abduction in the United States
Films about pets
Films shot in New Orleans
Films produced by Jason Blum
Blumhouse Productions films
English-language Netflix original films
Reboot films
2018 drama films
2010s English-language films
Films directed by Brandon Camp
2010s American films